The National Institutes of Technology are a group of higher education engineering institutes in India.

National Institute of Technology may also refer to:
 National Institute of Technology (Indonesia)
 National Institute of Technology (Norway)
 National Institute of Technology (United States)
 Kumoh National Institute of Technology, South Korea
 National Institute of Technology and Evaluation, Japan

See also
 National Institute (disambiguation)
 Technology